Dude, That's My Ghost! (French: Mon Pote le fantôme) is a 2013 Anglo-French animated television series created by Jan Van Rijsselberge, produced by Alphanim, and directed by Frédéric Martin. The series aired on Disney XD in the United Kingdom and BBC Kids in Canada. The series was created and designed by Jan Van Rijsselberge, creator of X-DuckX and Robotboy. Dude, That's My Ghost! produced 52 eleven-minute episodes. The show premiered on 2 February 2013 on Disney XD.

Plot
For Spencer Wright, a 14-year-old budding filmmaker, Beverly Heights is the ultimate thrill ride. But, being the new kid at a high school populated by Hollywood royalty, he's an outsider with no ticket in. He's the kind of kid who gets his allowance in cash, not stock options; finding himself amid all this bling and stardom is intimidating. Luckily, he's got an all-access pass in the form of his best friend, the ghost of pop star Billy Joe Cobra.

Characters

Spencer Wright (Rasmus Hardiker) - Spencer is the 14-year-old protagonist of the series. He is a budding filmmaker and makes his own amateur films on a regular basis. He aspires to be a famous film director. Spencer is a particular fan of horror films, with nearly all of his own homemade films having to do with either zombies, serial killers, demons, or monsters in some way. Spencer wears a blue guitar pick necklace that used to belong to Billy in order to see him. Because he is fairly new to Beverly Heights and is very different from the norm (in that he isn't wealthy, trendy, or the 'Hollywood type') he clashes with many people at his school and has garnered a number of enemies (Principal Ponzi, Lolo, and Kleet) although he receives help dealing with them from Billy. Likewise, Spencer helps Billy by protecting him from his enemies, like Madame X and Hoover. He also normally has to help solve problems caused by Billy as well, mostly pertaining to the effects of his ectoplasm and/or general antics.
Billy Joe Cobra (Darren Foreman) - He is a funny, mischievous ghost and best friend of Spencer, as well as his distant relative/cousin. Before he died, he was an extremely famous pop star, and is still very popular posthumously. He can not be seen or heard by others unless they wear a personal item that belonged to him before his death (for example, the necklace worn by Spencer). Billy's personality consists of both a bro-centric best friend and a stereotypical narcissistic celebrity. He tries to help Spencer with his films and more to fit into life in Hollywood, although many of his efforts usually cause more problems. He often describes his days as a rock star, in which it is shown that he was extremely difficult to work with (showing up to a video shoot 2 days late and refusing to perform because he didn't like the camera man's jeans), loved to trash hotel rooms and wreck music video shoots, and treated his crew and staff horribly. He can also be somewhat temperamental, especially when someone insults him or his music. Nearly every one of Billy's songs involve him singing about how much he loves himself or how much everyone else loves him ("I'm Still in Love With Me", "I Am the Sunshine of My Life", "You Love Me, I Love Me More", etc.) although sometimes they are about things related to stereotypically extravagant lifestyles ("Big Yachts and Money"). Billy is extremely wealthy: possessing a custom limo, several private jets, planes, and yachts, a pet crocodile, and the large mansion that Spencer's family now live in.

Broadcast
The show was first broadcast in 2013 on Disney XD in United Kingdom. A few months after its original release, it premiered on Disney XD in Turkey and the Middle East & Disney XD Latin America in August 2013. By 2015 it had broadcast in Canada on BBC Kids. As of November 13, 2020, the series is available in its entirety on Disney+ in various European countries.

Episodes

See also
List of ghost films

References

2013 British television series debuts
2013 British television series endings
2010s British animated television series
2010s British children's television series
2013 French television series debuts
2013 French television series endings
2010s French animated television series
British children's animated comedy television series
British children's animated fantasy television series
British children's animated horror television series
British children's animated supernatural television series
British flash animated television series
French children's animated comedy television series
French children's animated fantasy television series
French children's animated horror television series
French children's animated supernatural television series
French flash animated television series
English-language television shows
French-language television shows
Gaumont Animation
Disney XD original programming
Teen animated television series
Animated television series about ghosts
Television shows set in California
Television shows filmed in California
Television shows set in Los Angeles
Television shows filmed in Los Angeles
Television series created by Jan Van Rijsselberge
Hollywood, Los Angeles in fiction